Yordan Hadzhikonstantinov, called Dzhinot (the Jinn) (c. 1818 – 22 August 1882), was a Bulgarian teacher and author, an important figure of the Bulgarian National Revival during the 19th century.

Yordan Hadzhikonstantinov devoted all his life to the cause of secular public education, and he actively promoted the idea of enforcement of spoken vernacular in the schools and applying of modern pedagogical practices. Despite his Bulgarian ethnic self-identification and the fact, he called his native dialect  Bulgarian language and his country Lower Moesia or Old Bulgaria, according to the historiography in North Macedonia, Dzhinot had an ethnic Macedonian identity and promoted education in Macedonian.

Biography 
He was born around 1818 in Köprülü, Ottoman Empire (today in North Macedonia). Yordan completed his basic education in a local church school at Veles and next, he attended the high schools at Thesalonika and Samokov. In 1840 he started to teach as a private teacher, and in 1845 he was appointed a teacher in a municipal school at Veles. There Yordan involved in a conflict with the Greek clergy and he was forced to leave the town. In 1848 he settled in Üsküp (now Skopje), where he worked as a teacher in the Bulgarian school. There Yordan applied modern pedagogical methods in his practice. In January 1857 Yordan was dismissed from the service under the pressure of the Greek metropolitan bishop of Üsküp. The same year the local Turkish authorities had Yordan exiled from Üsküp, where he would not return.

In 1861, when the Grand Vizier of the Empire visited Köprülü, the local bishop Benedictus accused Yordan Hadzhikonstantinov of spying and conspiracy with the Serbs and the Bulgarian leader Georgi Rakovski, whose prohibited in Turkey books and newspapers Yordan had kept in his private library. The Grand Vizier believed the allegations and had Yordan exiled in Aydın, (Asia Minor). On the way to Aydin Yordan lost one of his eyes, and because of that he was called "The Jinn" (Джинот, Dzhinot). He returned from exile in 1863 and devoted all of his time to education.

Yordan Hadzhikonstantinov-Dzhinot died in Köprülü on 22 August 1882.

Works
Yordan Hadzhikonstantinov was in touch with the Society of the Serbian Letters (Serbian Academy of Sciences and Arts) in Belgrade and he published some of his discoveries on the pages of Glasnik (an official tribune of the society). On 24 January 1854 Yordan sent from Skopje a manuscript copy of а medieval Bulgarian record, called "A narration about the restoration of the Bulgarian Patriarchate in 1235", which was discovered at first by Dzhinot and was published in Glasnik in 1855. Yordan Hadzhikonstantinov-Dzhinot found a manuscript of a Bulgarian medieval story "An oration of Saint Cyril, how he baptized the Bulgarian people", called "Solunska legenda" ("A legend from Thesalonika"). It was published in Glasnik in 1856.

Yordan Hadzhikonsatntinov was author of some patriotic articles in the Bulgarian Tsarigradski Vestnik (Istanbul newspaper), as "God" (published in 1851),  "Bulgarian literature" (1852), "About the Church Slavonic language" (1852), "Veles" (1857), "Prilep" (1854) etc. They contain information about the history and geography of the  Macedonian region, and also some information about the history of the Bulgarian people, Bulgarian education and the Bulgarian Archbishopric of Ohrid. Being an adherent of the autochthonous theory about the origin of the Bulgarians, Yordan Hadzhikonstantinov-Dzhinot thought that Bulgarians are descendants of the ancient Thracians and Illyrians. In his publications, Yordan lost no occasion to declare his Bulgarian ethnic identity. He openly stated: " I am Bulgarian, and I bewail our lost Bulgarians, who are in  Lower Moesia, and it is our duty to lay down our life for our brothers, the dearest Bulgarians".

References

Primary sources
Iордан Хаџи Констандинов. О основанию Блъгарског Патрияршества, Гласник Друштва србске словестности, VII (Београд, 1855), с. 174-177.
Iордан Хаџи Констандинов. Слово Кирила славенца солунскаго философа бугарскаго, Гласник Друштва србске словестности, VIII (Београд, 1856), с. 146-147.
Йордан Хаджиконстантинов-Джинот. Българин съм. Предг., съст. и ред. И. Радев. Велико Търново: Абагар, 1993.

Secondary sources

Notes

External links
 Йордан Хаджиконстантинов-Джинот. Българин съм. Предг., съст. и ред. И. Радев. Велико Търново, 1993..
 Georgiev, Emil. Люлка на старата и новата българска писменост.
 Кънчов, В. Избрани произведения. Т. II. София, 1970.
 Тъпкова-Заимова, В.; Милтенова, А. (1996). Историко-апокалиптичната книжнина във Византия и в средновековна България. София: Университетско изсдателство "Св. Климент Охридски". 311-321. .
 Джинот - кратки биографични бележки и факсимилета от дописки

1810s births
1882 deaths
People from Veles, North Macedonia
Bulgarian writers
Bulgarian educators
19th-century Bulgarian educators
Macedonian Bulgarians